Erika Doornbos (born October 12, 1956) is a Dutch curler. She plays for Curling Club Utrecht and plays lead in the Dutch national team. At the 2004 European Curling Championships, Doornbos was an alternate for Shari Leibbrandt-Demmon's 12th place team. In 2005, she was Leibbrandt-Demmon's second and they finished in 7th place.

External links
 http://www.curling.nl
 http://www.curlingclubutrecht.nl

1956 births
Living people
Dutch female curlers
Place of birth missing (living people)
21st-century Dutch women